The German word Theaterplatz (Theatre Square) may refer to:

 Willy-Brandt-Platz, a square in Frankfurt
 Richard-Wagner-Platz (Leipzig), a square in Leipzig
 Theaterplatz (Dresden), a square in Dresden
 A square in Weimar next to the Deutsches Nationaltheater und Staatskapelle Weimar

See also 
 Theatre Square (disambiguation), in English